Alitet Leaves for the Hills is a 1949 Soviet drama film directed by Mark Donskoy.

Plot 
The inhabitants of Chukotka were cruelly exploited before the revolution. Once Chukotka was visited by the representative of the Kamchatka Revolutionary Committee Los and the ethnographer Zhukov. The news of the arrival of the Russians immediately dispersed along the coast. Contrary to the pressure of the American Thomson and the local "oligarch" Alitet in Chukotka, fair trade laws were established, as a result of which the Americans and Alitet left Chukotka.

Starring 
 Andrei Abrikosov as Nikita Sergeevich Los (as A. Abrikosov)
 Lev Sverdlin as Alitet (as L. Sverdlin)
 Boris Tenin as Charlie Thomson (as B. Tenin)
 Yuri Leonidov as Frank (as Yu. Leonidov)
 Lenvlad Turkin as Andrey Zhukov (as L. Turkin)
 Muratbek Ryskulov as Vaal (as M. Ryskulov)
 Kenenbai Kozhabekov as Aye (as K. Kozhebekov)
 Nurmukhan Zhanturin as Tomatuge (as N. Dzhanturin)
 Zana Zanoni as Rultyna (as Z. Zanoni)
 Gulfairus Ismailova as Tygrena (as G. Ismailova)
 B. Saraliyev as Yarak
 Ioakim Maksimov-Koshkinskiy as Shaman (as Ya. Maksimov-Koshkinskiy)

References

External links 
 

1949 films
1940s Russian-language films
Soviet black-and-white films
Soviet drama films
1949 drama films